Alina Dikhtiar (born 29 July 1988) is a Ukrainian pair skater. With partner Filip Zalevski, she is the 2006 Ukrainian silver medalist and 2005 Junior national champion. Their highest placement at an ISU Championship was 12th at the 2005 World Junior Championships.

Programs 
(with Zalevski)

Competitive highlights 
(with Zalevski)

References

External links
 
 Alina Dikhtiar / Filip Zalevski at Tracings.net
 Pairs on Ice: Dikhtiar & Zalevski

Ukrainian female pair skaters
Sportspeople from Dnipro
1988 births
Living people